Mats Wilander was the defending champion, but lost in the final to Boris Becker. The score was 6–4, 6–2.

Seeds

Draw

Finals

Top half

Section 1

Section 2

Bottom half

Section 3

Section 4

References

External links
 Official results archive (ATP)
 Official results archive (ITF)

1985 Grand Prix (tennis)